Ganienkeh (meaning Land of the Flint in Mohawk) is a Mohawk community located on about  near Altona, New York in the far northeast corner of the North Country.  Established by an occupation of Mohawk warriors in the late 1970s, it is a rare case in which an indigenous people reclaiming land from the United States succeeded. Issues of sovereignty and governmental relations have not been settled.

History
In May 1974 traditionalist Mohawks repossessed land near Old Forge, New York, occupying Moss Lake, a girls' camp. They claimed the land under the concept that it had been part of their historic territory in the area, and that New York had made an illegal treaty in 1797 when purchasing land from their leader Joseph Brant.

These Mohawk had left the Akwesasne, Kahnawake, and other reservations to rebuild traditional lives.  The land dispute (as Altona residents and government objected to the Mohawk claim of sovereignty) has not been fully settled.  The action was related to rising Native American activism, and specific land claims being filed against New York State by separate nations of the Iroquois. As allies of the defeated British, they had been forced to cede their historic lands to the state after the American Revolution, but the US Senate had never ratified the treaty, making it invalid under the constitution. Some believe that the 1794 Treaty of Canandaigua give the Iroquois nations continuing rights to land in the present-day state. The Oneida won a lands claim case, and others continued in negotiation in the late 20th century.

At the same time, the founding of Ganienkeh was related to Mohawk local issues, as some families wanted to leave the reservation environment. They found it had problems with alcohol and substance abuse, among other issues.

The three-year armed occupation of the camp ended in 1977 after nearly 200 negotiation sessions with New York state leaders. The Mohawk agreed to move to territory at Miner Lake that was initially designated as a State Park, which was offered by New York State through an intermediary trust. Unlike at the ten reservations within the borders of the state, in which federally recognized tribes have a relation with the federal government and the state has no authority over them, the jurisdictional relationships between the tribe and New York have not been defined at this territory. By 1990, the Mohawk still prohibited outsiders from entering the territory.<ref name="nytimes.com">SAM HOWE VERHOVEK, "Standoff Ends, but Not Mohawk Defiance", The New York Times", 14 Apr 1990, 27 Feb 2010</ref>

The local townspeople helped supply them with food and other necessities during the first winter as they were allowed to take nothing but their personal property."The Warrior's Society and the Black Market" , in Sin-Tax Failure: The Market in Contraband Tobacco and Public Safety, The Mackenzie Institute, Toronto: 1994, accessed 27 Feb 2010  The Mohawk established a "permanent nonreservation settlement" and claimed sovereign status. "Ganienkeh's founding was a rare case of Indigenous people reclaiming land from the United States."

Ganienkeh spokespeople state it is the only Kanienkehaka (Mohawk Nation) community that functions solely under the original Kaianerehkowa (the Constitution of the Iroquois Confederacy) without influence or interference of the United States or Canadian governments.  The people claim that the Two Row Wampum (Guswhenta'') guarantees Ganienkeh the right to exist as a sovereign entity within the international community. They note that as a sovereign people they may not be taxed by New York or the federal government.

In 1990 Ganienkeh introduced tax-free bingo, and its 1500-person hall is often filled to capacity. This activity has generated income which the community has invested in economic development projects. They also sell cigarettes tax free. 
They established the Ganienkeh Holistic Center, which provides classes and education to everyone in the larger community. They also opened the nine-hole Ganienkeh Golf Course, available to players for a fee. 

These businesses are communally operated for the benefit of the Territory. Through regular convened community meetings, every resident of Ganienkeh may participate in the day-to-day government of the community. Ganienkeh is a dry community, prohibiting all recreational drugs and alcohol.

See also
 Akwesasne
 Kahnawake
 Kanesatake
 Six Nations of the Grand River First Nation

References

External links
 Ganienkeh.net

Mohawk tribe
Iroquois populated places
Native American tribes in New York (state)
History of New York (state)